Wādī Ḩamīr is a wadi in Southern Iraq, nearby to the towns of Mukhāţ, Tall Mukhāţ, Nukhayb and Ar Raţţāwī.
It lies just north of the Saudi Arabian border on the road from Baghdad to the Arar, Saudi Arabia oil fields. The Wadi is known to originate from Northern Saudi Arabia, an arid, hot desert climate where precipitation is too low to sustain any vegetation.

References

Geography of Saudi Arabia
Hamir